Daniel Leslie Clevedon McDiarmid (16 July 1901 — 13 July 1959) was an Australian rules footballer who played for Geelong in the Victorian Football League (now known as the Australian Football League).

References 

1901 births
1959 deaths
Geelong Football Club players
Kalgoorlie Railways Football Club players
Australian rules footballers from Western Australia